Sokolskoye is an urban locality (an urban-type settlement) in Sokolsky District of Nizhny Novgorod Oblast, Russia. Population:

References

Urban-type settlements in Nizhny Novgorod Oblast
Sokolsky District, Nizhny Novgorod Oblast
Makaryevsky Uyezd (Kostroma Governorate)